Carl-Edgar Jarchow (born 29 March 1955 in Hamburg) is a German politician (FDP) and chairman of the football club Hamburger SV.

Jarchow was in the 1990s member of the Statt Partei and vice-chairman of this party in the state of Hamburg. In 2007 he became a member of the liberal FDP. At the 2011 Hamburg state election he was elected in the Hamburg Parliament. Since April 2011 he is a member of the Hamburg state executive board of the party. Since March 2011 Jarchow is chairman of the football club Hamburger SV.

References 

1955 births
Free Democratic Party (Germany) politicians
Living people
Members of the Hamburg Parliament